Galina Nikitina (born 1952) is a former Soviet female speed skater. She won a bronze medal at the World Allround Speed Skating Championships for Women in 1977.

References

External links

1952 births
Living people
Soviet female speed skaters
World Allround Speed Skating Championships medalists